The 1963 United States Road Racing Championship season was the first season of the Sports Car Club of America's United States Road Racing Championship. It began February 3, 1963, and ended September 22, 1963, after eight races.  Separate races for sportscars and GTs were held at four rounds, while three rounds were combined races, and one round (Daytona) was for sportscars only.  Bob Holbert won the season championship, splitting time between the under-two liter sportscar and GT classes.

Schedule

Season results
Overall winner in bold.

External links
World Sports Racing Prototypes: USRRC 1963
World Sports Racing Prototypes: USRRC GT 1963
Racing Sports Cars: USRRC archive

United States Road Racing Championship
United States Road Racing Championship